Cholinergic blocking drugs are a group of drugs that block the action of acetylcholine (ACh), a neurotransmitter, in synapses of the cholinergic nervous system. They block acetylcholine from binding to cholinergic receptors, namely the nicotinic and muscarinic receptors.

These agents have broad effects due to their actions in nerves located vastly over the body. These nerves include motor nerves in somatic nervous system which innervate skeletal muscles as well as nerves in the sympathetic and parasympathetic nervous systems. Organs that receive innervations from these systems include exocrine glands, heart, eyes, gastrointestinal tract etc. Antimuscarinic and antinicotinic agents can increase heart rate, inhibit secretions, and gastrointestinal motility.

Naturally occurring antimuscarinics were found in alkaloids from Belladonna (Solanaceae) plants. They were used as deadly poison and pupil-dilating cosmetics. While curare, the naturally occurring antinicotinics derived from Chondrodendron and Strychnos, was a poison used by South American Indians for hunting.

According to their site of actions, cholinergic blocking drugs can be classified into two general types — antimuscarinic and antinicotinic agents. Antimuscarinic agents (also known as muscarinic antagonists), including atropine and hyoscine, block acetylcholine at the muscarinic acetylcholine receptors. Antinicotinic agents (also known as ganglionic blockers, neuromuscular blockers), including tubocurarine and hexamethonium, block acetylcholine action at nicotinic acetylcholine receptors. Their effects are based on the expression of corresponding receptors in different parts of the body.

There are many adverse effects, interactions and contraindications for antinicotinic and antimuscarinic agents. Adverse effects include hypotension, dry mouth, dry eyes etc. They interact with grapefruit juice and various medications, e.g. warfarin, metoclopramide. Therefore, cautions should be exercised and advice from medical professionals should be sought before using medications.

History

Discovery of cholinergic nervous system 
In 1900, Reid Hunt, a pharmacologist (1870-1948), realised a fall in blood pressure in rabbits after removing adrenaline (epinephrine) from adrenal glands extract. While he initially attributed this effect to choline, he later discovered acetylcholine was 100 000 times more potent in lowering blood pressure.

British physiologist Sir Henry Hallett Dale (1875-1968) observed acetylcholine for causing blood vessel dilation and slowing down heart rate. In 1914, Dale noted that the physiological effect of acetylcholine resembled the stimulation of parasympathetic nervous system and hypothesized acetylcholine as the neurotransmitter. Later, Dale named substances that mimic acetylcholine action as “cholinergics”.

In 1914, Dale also distinguished two types of activities of acetylcholine, namely muscarinic and nicotinic, as they mimic the effects of injecting muscarine, extracted from poisonous mushroom Amanita muscaria, and nicotine.

Antimuscarinic agents 
Naturally occurring antimuscarinics were found in alkaloids from Belladonna (Solanaceae) plants. They were used as deadly poison in Roman Empire and Middle Ages. The name Belladonna, meaning beautiful ladies, was derived from women using berry juice from the plant cosmetically to dilate their pupils.

The mydriatic effect was studied by the German chemist Friedlieb Ferdinand Runge (1795-1867), in which the active ingredient, atropine, was first discovered by Vaquelin in 1809 and was first isolated by Heinrich F. G. Mein in 1813.

In the 1850s, atropine was used as antispasmodic in asthma treatment and as morphine antidote for its mydriatic effect. Bezold and Bloebaum showed that atropine blocked the effects of vagal stimulation on the heart in 1867. Subsequently in 1872, Heidenhain found its ability to prevent salivary secretion.

Antinicotinic agents 
Curare, derived from Chondrodendron and Strychnos, was used as poison by South American Indians to coat arrow tips or blow-pipe darts for hunting animals. It is first identified when Spanish soldiers were attacked by these indigenous tribes in the 16th century.

In 1906, Langley studied the actions of nicotine and curare on chicken and frog muscles. Curare was found to block the stimulant action of nicotine in both innervated and chronically denervated muscles. In 1940, Jenkinson identified tubocurarine as a competitive antagonist of acetylcholine.  

Curare and tubocurarine had important roles in establishing the concept of specific cholinoceptors in the motor end plate. At right dose, they are used as general anesthetic for relaxing abdominal muscles in operations.

General effects on body

Antimuscarinic agents 
Muscarinic receptors are G-protein coupled receptors that present mainly in the parasympathetic system and sweat gland. Antimuscarinc agents, therefore, generally produce effects that are opposite to the stimulation of the parasympathetic system, which is responsible for “rest and digest”.

Antinicotinic agent 
Nicotinic receptors are ligand-gated ion channels that present in both parasympathetic and sympathetic ganglions, while the antagonistic effect of antinicotinic agents depend on which system predominates in a particular site. Nicotinic receptors are also present in neuromuscular junctions and the brain.

Clinical uses 
Listed below are some examples of antimuscarinic and antinicotinic agents according to the British National Formulary, including non-clinically one for better illustration of their site of actions.

Antimuscarinic agents 
Antimuscarinic agents are muscarinic antagonists and they bind to muscarinic cholinergic receptors postsynaptically without activating them. They occupy and prevent acetylcholine from binding to the active sites of receptors to elicit their effect.

Antinicotinic agents 
Antinicotinic agents are classified into ganglionic blockers and neuromuscular blockers.

Ganglionic blockers are of little clinical use as they act at all autonomic ganglions. They act by:

 Interfering acetylcholine release
 Prolonged depolarization (depolarisation block), i.e. stimulation then block stimulation
 Competitive inhibition of nicotinic receptor

Neuromuscular blockers act at neuromuscular junction by:

 Inhibiting acetylcholine synthesis
 Inhibiting acetylcholine release
 Blocking acetylcholine receptors postsynaptically
 Prolonged depolarization of motor end plate

Adverse effects

Drug reactions 
The following are some side effects after taking either antinicotinic or anticholinergic medications. They vary from mild to severe and some of these effects depends on the duration of drug usage.

Cognitive function decline (Confusion, memory loss and difficulty in concentration) paralysis, Tachycardia, Hypotension (Anticholinergics are histamine-inducing, leading to vasodilation during anaphylactic reaction, hence a dropping in blood pressure), constipation, dry mouth, dry eyes, hypohidrosis/ anhidrosis, blurry vision, or Increase in intraocular pressure, increase in the risk of glaucoma.

Overdose 
Anticholinergic overdose, both antinicotinic and antimuscarinic, can exert toxic effects on both central and peripheral systems. The following symptoms could be presented:

Mild symptoms include tachycardia, flushed face, mydriasis and blurred vision, fever, dry mouth and skin, and urinary retention. Early stage of overdose can lead to central nervous system stimulation, for instance, hyperactivity, followed by depression, such as agitation (Anxiety or nervous), delirium, disorientation, hallucinations, seizures, hypertension, or hyperthermia. In late or severe stage of overdose, it could lead to coma, medullary paralysis, death.

Supportive care is usually performed in anticholinergic toxicated patients. Intravenous benzodiazepine is used as a first-line treatment for agitation. Cooling measures are employed if there is any significant hyperthermia. Activated charcoal is only given within one hour of anticholinergic ingestion. Physostigmine is given only if presenting both peripheral and central signs and symptoms of anticholinergic poisoning. Physostigmine is a central and peripheral acting acetylcholinesterase inhibitor and generally given to patients with pure anticholinergic poisoning.

Interactions 
Combined use of medications with anticholinergics may cause synergistic (supraadditive), additive, or antagonistic interactions, leading to no therapeutic effect or overdosing. Below listed are some medications or food that can interact with anticholinergics.

Medications indicated for:

 Irregular heartbeat, e.g. disopyramide, quinidine. Drug-induced arrhythmia worsened by anticholinergics’ side effect of tachycardia.
 Parkinson’s disease, e.g. levodopa. Atropine decreases the absorption of levodopa.
 Preventing travel sickness, relieve stomach cramps or spasms, e.g. hyoscine. Additive effect.
 Nausea and vomiting, e.g. cyclizine. Additive effect.
 Parasympathetic stimulation, e.g. bethanechol, pilocarpine, carbachol
 Antihistamines e.g. chlorpheniramine, diphenhydramine, promethazine. They have similar structures as anticholinergics, causing additive effect.
 Tricyclic antidepressants, e.g. amitriptyline, clomipramine. Additive effect.
 Adrenergic decongestants, e.g. phenylephrine. Combined use with atropine increases the risk of severe hypertension.
 Alzheimer's disease e.g. rivastigmine and donepezil. May reduce seizure threshold.
 Muscle relaxants for surgery. 
 Grapefruit juice and grapefruit-based products. CYP3A4 inhibitor which may reduce or amplify drug effect, such as darifenacin.

Contraindications 
The followings are the common contraindications adopted from the British National Formulary.

Antimuscarinic agents 

For all antimuscarinics,

 Angle-closure glaucoma 
 Bladder outlet obstruction (BOO)
 Myasthenia gravis
 Gastro-intestinal obstruction
 Toxic megacolon
 Urinary retention
 Paralytic ileus
 Intestinal atony (paralysis of muscles)
 Severe ulcerative colitis
 Hypertension, especially M2 receptor antagonists

Antinicotinic agents 
For anticholinergics, such as

 Trimethoprim: 
 Blood dyscrasias
 Suxamethonium: 
 Hyperkalemia
 Low plasma-cholinesterase activity e.g. severe liver disease
 Major trauma
 Personal or family history of congenital myotonic disease
 Personal or family history of malignant hyperthermia
 Prolonged immobilisation
 Severe burns
 Skeletal muscle myopathies e.g. Duchenne muscular dystrophy

References 

Drugs
Acetylcholine
Acetylcholine receptors